Olney is a U.S. census-designated place and an unincorporated area in Montgomery County, Maryland.

Olney was largely agricultural until the 1960s, when growth of Washington, D.C.'s suburbs led to its conversion into a mostly residential area. It has a total population of 35,820 as of the 2020 United States census.

History
In 1763, Richard Brooke received a patent for a tract of land located in the Province of Maryland. Originally known as Mechanicsville, the village which became Olney was established in 1800. The area was mostly farmland, but it soon began attracting artisans. Early residents Sarah Brooke and Dr. Charles Farquhar were devotees of the English poet William Cowper, and named their home after the poet's hometown of Olney in England. The area was later named for their home, which still stands and is known as the Olney House. In the town's center was a blacksmith, William Kelley's wheelwright shop, Canby's pottery factory, and a Benedict Duley's store.

The Brooke family held the largest tracts of land in Olney, whose central village was at the intersection of the Rockville to Baltimore road, and the one which connected Washington with Westminster to the north. The Quaker community in Sandy Spring thrived just to Olney's east. The Sandy Spring Museum is a historical museum featuring educational programs and displays. St. John's Episcopal Church was established in 1842 and survives to this day.

Although not as involved in the Civil War as areas of Maryland to the west, Olney residents still experienced the tug-of-war between loyalty to the plantation economy of the South and to the Federal government in Maryland's midst. Both Union and Confederate forces made stops in Olney during the war. Union Generals George B. McClellan and Ambrose Burnside led soldiers through in the midst of the Maryland Campaign in 1862. During the Gettysburg Campaign in 1863, Confederate General J. E. B. Stuart marched between 10,000 and 20,000 troops north through the village and raided it of supplies, including horses and crops from surrounding farms in which they bivouacked.

Olney served as the original headquarters of the Emergency Management Institute, founded in 1951 as the Civil Defense Staff College (CDSC) to provide training for civil defense. While there, the college built "Rescue Street," a training center designed to resemble atomic bomb ruins. The CDSC was soon relocated to Battle Creek, Michigan due to security concerns of a potential attack on Washington, D.C. during the Cold War.

Geography

Olney's town center sits at the intersection of state route 97 (Georgia Avenue) and route 108 (Olney-Laytonsville Road). The town, larger than any other in the neighboring areas, lies south of Brookeville, west of Sandy Spring, east-northeast of Gaithersburg, north-northeast of Rockville, and north of Aspen Hill.

Demographics

At the 2010 U.S. Census, there were 33,844 people, 11,606 households, and 9,447 families residing in the area. The ethnic makeup of the area was 75.1% White, 11.9% African American, 12.0% Asian, 8.5% Hispanic or Latino, and 0.53% Native American. 3.1% of the population identifies with "Some Other Race."

There were 11,606 households, of which 81.4% were family households. Among all households:
 41.7%  had children under the age of 18 living with them.
 67.2% were married couples living together.
 11.0% had a woman householder with no husband present.
 3.1% had a man householder with no wife present.
 22.8% had individuals 65 years and over.
 18.6% were non-families.
The average household size was 2.91 and the average family size was 3.25.

28.9% of residents were under the age of 20, 25.8% from 20 to 44, 34.4% from 45 to 64, and 10.8% 65 years of age or older. The median age was 41.9 years. For every 100 women, there were 91.8 men.

According to a 2015 survey, the median household income was $126,762, and the median family income was $138,072. Men had a median income of $96,624 versus $68,709 for women. The per capita income for the area was $48,289. 2.8% of the population and 2.3% of families were below the poverty line.

Arts and culture
Historic sites include Olney Ale House, Sandy Spring Museum, and Woodlawn Manor Living History Museum.

"Olney Days" is held annually each April, and included a parade and charity bike ride and walk.

Founded in 1938, the Olney Theatre is one of two state theaters in Maryland. It presents dramatic and musical live theatrical productions.

There is a branch of the Montgomery County Library.

Falling Green had been an active farm since 1764. A house and barn survive from the original farm. Falling Green house is a Georgian architecture house built in 1770 by a Quaker planter.

Parks and recreation

Public parks include Olney Manor Park (which features the Olney Swim Center), Southeast Olney Park, Longwood Park, Cherrywood Park, Bowie Mill Park, and the OBGC Park at Freeman Fields.

Olney is also home to a private country club and a golf driving range,and the Norbeck golf course.

Education
There are three Montgomery County Public School clusters that bisect Olney, with some children attending elementary and middle schools that send students on to Magruder High School and others attending schools that send students to Sherwood High School or James Hubert Blake High School. The Our Lady of Good Counsel High School building opened in January 2007, enabling the Roman Catholic high school to relocate to Olney from Wheaton, Maryland. The new building of Washington Christian Academy opened in 2008 in Olney.  Brooke Grove Elementary School, a public elementary school in Olney, was awarded in 1999 the Blue Ribbon School for Excellence. Cashell Elementary School was also selected as a 2014 National Blue Ribbon School. Other elementary schools serving Olney include Olney Elementary School, Belmont, and Sherwood. Middle schools include William Farquhar and Rosa Parks.

Notable people
Joe Aitcheson Jr., jockey in Racing Hall of Fame
Hilda Counts, first woman to gain a degree in Electrical Engineering from the University of Colorado spent her later years in Olney.
Stefon Diggs, wide receiver for the Buffalo Bills; attended Our Lady of Good Counsel in Olney, Maryland.
Harold L. Ickes, Secretary of the Interior, bought the  Headwaters Farm in 1937. His wife maintained the farm after his death in 1952 until she sold it in 1971. The Ickes' large white house still stands in the middle of the original core of the Olney Oaks development/subdivision.
Frank Miller, an artist and film director best known for his film noir-style comic book stories
Justin Maxwell, outfielder for the Washington Nationals, Houston Astros, Kansas City Royals, San Francisco Giants, and Lotte Giants
Moira Geoffrion, sculptor
Katie Feeney, social media personality and correspondent for the Washington Commanders

References

External links

Chamber of Commerce

 
Census-designated places in Maryland
Census-designated places in Montgomery County, Maryland
Populated places established in 1800
1800 establishments in Maryland